Olearia myrsinoides, commonly known as silky daisy-bush or blush daisy bush, is a species of flowering plant in the family Asteraceae and is endemic to south-eastern Australia. It is a spreading shrub with hairy branchlets, egg-shaped to elliptic leaves with toothed edges, and white and yellow or mauve, daisy-like inflorescences.

Description
The upper surface of the leaves is dark green and glabrous, the lower side covered with whitish hairs.

Taxonomy
Silky daisy-bush was first formally described in 1806 by Jacques Labillardière, who gave it the name Aster myrsinoides in his Novae Hollandiae Plantarum Specimen. In 1867, George Bentham changed the name to Olearia myrsinoides in Flora Australiensis.

Distribution and habitat
Olearia myrsinoides grows in forest, woodland, grassland, and swampy areas in eastern New South Wales, southern Victoria and Tasmania.

References

Asterales of Australia
Flora of New South Wales
Flora of Tasmania
Flora of Victoria (Australia)
myrsinoides
Plants described in 1806
Taxa named by Jacques Labillardière